Quilanga Canton is a canton of Ecuador, in the Loja Province.  Its capital is the town of Quilanga.  Its population at the 2001 census was 4,582.

References

Cantons of Loja Province